Flirt is a 2010 New York Times bestselling erotic thriller by novelist Laurell K. Hamilton. The novella was published on February 2, 2010, by Berkley Hardcover and is the eighteenth book in the Anita Blake: Vampire Hunter series. The afterword of Flirt contains several pages of discussion about Hamilton's inspiration for the novella as well as a comic by Jennie Breeden.

Plot
Flirt follows Anita as she is asked to raise the wife of the wealthy and powerful Tony Bennington. After refusing his request for a reanimation, Anita's lovers come to visit and Bennington reveals that his wife was a fan of Guilty Pleasures. Weeks later Anita comes across the werelions-for-hire Jacob and Nicky, who threaten to kill Micah, Nathaniel, and Jason unless she agrees to use her necromancy for their client. Anita is left with no choice but to comply, even as her inner werelioness reacts to Jacob and Nicky.

Anita soon discovers that Bennington is behind the kidnapping and threats, only for her inner lioness to react to the situation. In order to keep Bennington safe Jacob sequesters Anita, only for her lioness to further react to Jacob and Nicky. The two hit men end up giving into the natures of their were-beasts and battle for the chance to mate with Anita. Anita attempts to chase and attack Bennington, only to be stopped by a third member of Jacob's pride, Silas. She manages to wound Silas but Anita is ultimately re-captured and knocked unconscious. When she regains consciousness Anita manages to feed the ardeur off of Nicky, despite the initial attempts of Jacob and his pride's witch. The result is that Anita's magic completely dominates Nicky, turning him into a "slave" with no free will outside of what she allows him.

Anita is then brought to the grave of Bennington's wife and forced to use Silas as a "White Goat". Due to his supernatural nature Anita raises the entire cemetery, overwhelming the protection laid down by the pride witch. This enables Anita to psychically contact Jean-Claude, who swiftly captures Bennington's men. Jacob flees with his pride's witch, but only after watching Anita kill Bennington and leaving behind the now rolled Nicky. Anita takes in Nicky, worrying about her abilities and what his being so completely rolled might mean for her in the future.

Characters in Flirt

Major characters

Anita Blake: Anita is held against her will to raise a rich man's wife.

Micah Callahan: Nimir-Raj to Anita's Nimir-Ra. The first to be shot should Anita refuse to do as she's told.

Jean-Claude

Jason Schuyler: Anita's Wolf to call. Used as leverage to ensure Anita does what she's told

Nathaniel Graison: Anita's Leopard to call. Used as leverage to ensure Anita does what she's told

Other characters
New characters include:

Tony Bennington: Wealthy man unable to accept that his trophy wife is gone.
Jacob Leon: Alpha werelion, Rex of his pride and professional mercenary, his lion is attracted to Anita's lioness.
Nicky: One-eyed werelion, Jacob's second in command. He is attracted to Anita, since she isn't upset by his deformity, as female werelions are not attracted to signs of weakness.
Ellen: Werelion, but also a witch, and lesbian as mentioned by Nicky.
Silas: Another werelion working for Jacob. Psychopath.

Reception
Critical reception for Flirt has been mixed. Reviewers for BlogCritics.org were neutral to negative towards the book, with one stating that Hamilton has "strayed into muddy waters in terms on continuity of story and is having trouble keeping herself afloat". The other reviewer criticized the plot as "incredibly thin" but also stated that Flirt "reads quickly and the pacing stays on for the most part". A reviewer for the Library Journal praised the audiobook narration of Kimberly Alexis.

References

External links
 Official author site 

2010 American novels
American erotic novels
American horror novels
American mystery novels
Anita Blake: Vampire Hunter novels
American novellas
Berkley Books books